Theodore the Goalkeeper is a 1950 Austrian-German sports comedy film directed by E. W. Emo and starring Theo Lingen, Hans Moser, and Josef Meinrad.

It was shot at the Bavaria Studios in Munich with location shooting at the city's Grünwalder Stadion. The film's sets were designed by the art director Fritz Jüptner-Jonstorff. It was made with the co-operation of the German club 1860 Munich.

Cast

References

Bibliography

External links 
 

1950 films
1950s sports comedy films
Austrian sports comedy films
German sports comedy films
West German films
1950s German-language films
Films directed by E. W. Emo
German association football films
Lost German films
1950 comedy films
Austrian black-and-white films
German black-and-white films
Films shot in Munich
Films shot at Bavaria Studios
1950s German films